George Evans House, owned by the University of Delaware, is a historic home located at Newark in New Castle County, Delaware.  It was completed in 1863 and is a 2½-story, brick structure with a stone foundation, "T" shaped plan, and cross gable roof.  The main facade is three bays, featuring a one-bay portico supported by Doric order columns.  Its builder, George Gillespie Evans served as Secretary of the Board of Trustees of the University of Delaware from 1856 to 1903.

It was added to the National Register of Historic Places in 1982.

References

Houses on the National Register of Historic Places in Delaware
Italianate architecture in Delaware
Houses completed in 1863
University of Delaware
Houses in Newark, Delaware
National Register of Historic Places in New Castle County, Delaware